The Go-Katz are a British psychobilly band formed in Loughborough, Leicestershire in 1986.  The original members were Howard Raucous (real name Howard Piperides) on vocals, Beaker (real name Giles Brett) on guitar, Andy Young (guitar), Moff (real name Mark Moffat) on Double Bass, and Wolf (real name John Basford) on drums. The band members have formerly made up Loughborough bands The Exorcists and The Go-Go Dakotas.

The original line-up recorded a vinyl 7" EP called "The Go-Katz EP" released on Raucous Records in 1987. They also issued several tracks on psychobilly compilation albums from Raucous, Kix 4U Records (Netherlands) and Rockhouse Records (Netherlands).

The original lineup disbanded in 1988, when Beaker and Wolf departed, and new drummer Dave Fawkes was brought in. Under this line-up, which lasted until 1990, they released tracks on Raucous Records (UK) and Fury Records (UK).

Reformation

After more than a decade of inactivity, the Go-Katz resurfaced in 2003 in St Petersburg, Russia, with founder member Howard Raucous backed by members of Russian surf/psychobilly band The Bombers.  With this line-up they occasionally gigged in St Petersburg and recorded "When A Stranger Calls", a cover of a Meteors song for the tribute album "Sympathy For The Devil".

Meanwhile, interest in 1980s psychobilly bands increased, leading to a UK reformation in 2005, again with Howard Raucous being the only original member, with musicians from rockabilly trio The Top Cats drafted in.  This lineup lasted until 2010 to play psychobilly events around Europe.

The band had another two-year break, before reforming once again for one gig in 2012, with new members Sam Woods (ex-Hyperjax) on guitar and Tim Psykes on drums, which was followed by another two-year period of inactivity.

The Go-Katz returned again in October 2014, with Steve Clark back on drums, and new guitarist Hollie Vee Lucas.

Discography
The Go-Katz EP – Raucous Records RAUC001  1987
Real Gone Katz CD – Raucous Records RAUCD100  2004
Maniac CD – Raucous Records RAUCD215  2008
It's Not Fair CD – Raucous Records RAUCD241  2009

External links
 Raucous Records
 Official Go-Katz Website
 N.M.E.

See also
List of psychobilly bands

References

English rock music groups
British psychobilly musical groups
People from Loughborough
Musicians from Leicestershire